Jaslyn Hewitt-Shehadie (born 23 February 1983) is a former professional tennis player from Australia. She is the younger sister of Lleyton Hewitt.

Biography

Tennis career
A right-handed player from Adelaide, Hewitt was highly ranked in junior tennis and represented Australia at the 2000 Commonwealth Youth Games in Edinburgh.

Hewitt had a best singles ranking of 304 in the world on the professional circuit. In 2001 she featured in the main draws of two WTA Tour tournaments, the Croatian Bol Ladies Open and Belgium's Sanex Trophy, which was followed by home appearances at the 2002 Sydney International and 2005 Gold Coast Hardcourt. Her biggest title win came at the Canberra ITF in 2004, where she beat top seed Evie Dominikovic in the final of the $25,000 tournament. As a doubles player she competed as a wildcard in the main draw of the women's doubles at the Australian Open every year from 2002 to 2005.

Personal life
During her career she was in a relationship with Swedish tennis player Joachim Johansson, which lasted for five years.

In 2010 she married actor Rob Shehadie at a ceremony in Port Douglas.

ITF Circuit finals

Singles: 3 (1–2)

Doubles: 5 (3–2)

References

External links
 
 

1983 births
Living people
Australian female tennis players
Tennis players from Adelaide